Kevin Fitzgerald (born June 30, 1964) is a former tight end in the National Football League.

Biography
Fitzgerald was born on June 30, 1964.

Career
Fitzgerald was a member of the Green Bay Packers during the 1987 NFL season. He played at the collegiate level at the University of Wisconsin-Eau Claire.

See also
List of Green Bay Packers players

References

Sportspeople from La Crosse, Wisconsin
Players of American football from Wisconsin
American football tight ends
Green Bay Packers players
Arizona Rattlers players
Wisconsin–Eau Claire Blugolds football players
1964 births
Living people